Shashikala Saigal (née Jawalkar; 4 August 1932 – 4 April 2021), better known by her first name, was an Indian film and television actress, who played supporting roles in hundreds of Bollywood films beginning in the 1940s.

Early years
Shashikala Jawalkar was one of six children born in Solapur, Maharashtra to a Hindu Bhavsar Shimpi caste Marathi speaking family. By age 5, she had already been dancing, singing and acting on stage in many towns in Solapur district. When Shashikala was in her pre-teens, through ill luck, her father became bankrupt, and he brought his family to Bombay (now Mumbai), where they thought that Shashikala, the best-looking and most-talented among his children, could find work in movies. For some time, the family lived with friends and barely survived, while Shashikala wandered from one studio to another looking for work. She earned in bits and pieces till she met Noor Jehan, the reigning screen queen.

Noor Jehan's husband Shaukat Hussain Rizvi, was making the movie Zeenat then, and included Shashikala in a Qawwali scene. She worked with Shammi Kapoor in film Daku (1955). She struggled on and got small roles in movies made by P. N. Arora, Amiya Chakravarti, and a few other producers. She first rose to fame with her role in Hindi film Pugdi (1948) produced by Prem Narayan Arora. She got roles in V. Shantaram's Teen Batti Char Raasta (1953)  and a few other movies. While in her early twenties, Shashikala met and married Om Prakash Saigal, who belonged to the Kundan Lal Saigal family, and has two daughters.

Acclaimed supporting roles
In 1959, she appeared in Bimal Roy's Sujata. In Tarachand Barjatya's Aarti (1962), starring Meena Kumari, Ashok Kumar, and Pradeep Kumar, Shashikala portrayed a negative role, eventually winning a Filmfare Award. Soon after, offers began to pour in to her for supporting roles. She appeared in Anupama, Phool Aur Patthar, Ayi Milan Ki Bela, Gumrah, Waqt, and Khubsoorat. She played a negative character in Chhote Sarkar (1974) starring Shammi Kapoor and Sadhana. While her female lead co-stars usually played roles of good-natured, modest, or pious women, Shashikala usually played either flighty and feisty bubbly women or vamps who plotted the downfall of others. Later in her acting career, she would typically play the role of a sister or mother-in-law. In 80s her acclaimed performances came in films like Phir Wahi Raat, Souten, Sargam. She performed in supporting roles in more than 100 films.

Recent acting roles

In the past years, she has performed in a few television serials, including Jeena Isi Ka Naam Hai for Sony, Apnaapan for Zee TV, Dil Deke Dekho for Sab TV and Son Pari  for Star Plus. She had roles in Mother 98, Pardesi Babu, Baadshah, Kabhi Khushi Kabhie Gham, Mujhse Shaadi Karogi and Chori Chori.

Awards

Civilian Award
 2007 – Padma Shri – India's fourth highest civilian honour from the Government of India.

Film Awards

Selected filmography

 Karodpati (1936)
 Chand (1944)
 Zeenat (1945) as Qawalli singer (one of the females)
 Jugnu (1947)
 Doli (1947) (as Sashikala)
 Pugree (1948)
 Girls' School (1949)
 Bombay (1949)
 Bholi (1949)
 Aakhri Paigham (1949)
 Thes (1949)
 Rupaiya (1950)
 Raj Rani (1950)
 Patthe Bapurao (1950)
 Arzoo (1950) as Kamla
 Sarkar (1951)
 Chamkee (1952)
 Ajeeb Ladki (1952)
 Teen Batti Char Raasta (1953) as Lalita (Maratha wife)
 Madmust (1953)
 Jeewan Jyoti (1953) as Leela
 Chacha Chowdhury (1953)
 Surang (1953) as Pagli
 Parichay (1954)
 Shart (1954) as Toto
 Sangam (1954)
 Samaj (1954) (as Sashikala)
 Sitara (1955)
 Sakhi Lutera (1955)
 Sabse Bada Rupaiya (1955)
 Hoor-E-Arab (1955)
 Daku (1955)
 Bahu (1955)
 Abe-Hayat (1955) as Shehzadi
 Taj Aur Talwar (1956)
 Patrani (1956) as Namunjala
 Kar Bhala (1956)
 Diwali Ki Raat (1956)
 Bhagam Bhag (1956) as Shashi
 Bandhan (1956) as Shanta
 Arab Ka Saudagar (1956)
 Jahazi Lutera (1957)
 Beti (1957)
 Nau Do Gyarah (1957) as Neeta
 Lal Batti (1957)
 Captain Kishore (1957)
 Chandu (1958)
 Chalta Purza (1958)
 12 O'Clock (1958) as Neena
 Sun To Le Hasina (1958)
 Jung Bahadur (1958)
 Madam XYZ (1959)
 Khoobsurat Dhokha (1959)
 Rangeela Raja (1960)
 Kanoon (1960) as Murder's Girl Friend
 Sujata (1960) as Rama Chowdhury
 Teer Aur Talwar (1960)
 Singapore (1960) as Shobha
 Jo Huwa So Bhool Jao (1960)
 Do Aadmi (1960)
 Flight to Assam (1961)
 Junglee (1961) as Mala (as Shashi Kala)
 Krorepati (1961) as Roopa
 Batwara (1961) as Kala
 Hariyali Aur Rasta (1962) as Rita
 Naag Devata (1962)
 Anpadh (1962) as Basanti
 Aarti (1962) as Jaswanti
 Gumrah (1963) as Leela/Miss Roberts
 Commercial Pilot Officer (1963)
 Yeh Rastey Hain Pyar Ke (1963) as Asha
 Satyavan Savitri (1963)
 Hamrahi (1963) as Hemalata 'Hema'
 Godaan (1963)
 Punar Milan (1964) as Shobhna Bakshi
 Mera Qasoor Kya Hai (1964) as Shashi
 Jahan Ara (1964) as Karuna
 Ayee Milan Ki Bela (1964) as Roopa
 Apne Huye Paraye (1964) as Lata
 Aap Ki Parchhaiyan (1964) as Rekha
 Himalay Ki God Mein (1965) as Dr. Neeta Verma (as Shashi Kala)
 Waqt (1965) as Rani sahiba
 Teesra Kaun (1965) as Lily
 Neela Aakash (1965) as Rita
 Bheegi Raat (1965) as Vinita / Vinnie
 Bedaag (1965) as Lata
 Sunehre Qadam (1966)
 Anupama (1966) as Anita Bakshi 'Annie'
 Phool Aur Patthar (1966) as Rita
 Toofan Men Pyar Kahan (1966)
 Pyar Mohabbat (1966) as Mohini
 Pati Patni (1966) as Lali
 Neend Hamari Khwab Tumhare (1966) as Ms. Paul
 Do Dilon Ki Dastaan (1966)
 Devar (1966) as Shanta M. Singh / Shanta S. Rai
 Daadi Maa (1966) as Ganga
 Mehrban (1967) as Devki
 Chhoti Si Mulaqat (1967) as Sonia
 Neel Kamal (1968) as Chanchal
 Aabroo (1968) as Shanta
 Teen Bahuraniyan (1968) as Sheela Devi
 Tamanna (1969)
 Shatranj (1969) as Suzie
 Rahgir (1969)
 Paisa Ya Pyar (1969) as Lakshmi
 Saas Bhi Kabhi Bahu Thi (1970) as Maya M. Chaudhary
 Humjoli (1970) as Shyama Rai
 Ghar Ghar Ki Kahani (1970) as Jamuna
 Chhoti Bahu (1971) as Paro
 Woh Din Yaad Karo (1971) as Rajkumari / Saroj
 Jawan Muhabat (1971) as Mala Das (as Shashi Kala)
 Narad Leela (1972)
 Naag Panchami (1972) as Mahadevi Mansa
 Dastaan E Kashmir (1973)
 Chhote Sarkar (1974) as Seema
 Amaanat (1977) as Sonia
 Babruvahana (1977)
 Swami (1977) as Ghanshyam's step-mother
 Duniyadari (1977) as Malti devi
 Dulhan Wahi Jo Piya Man Bhaaye (1977) as Ms. Saxena (as Sashikala)
 Dildaar (1977) as Lata's mom (as Shashi Kala)
 Hamara Sansar (1978) as Pratap's Mother
 Bin Baap Ka Beta (1979)
 Sargam (1979) as Savitri Pradhan
 Zulm Ki Pukar (1979)
 Khubsoorat (1980) as Mrs. Gupta
 Kashish (1980) as Seema's Mother
 Phir Wohi Raat (1980) as Aunty
 Yeh Kaisa Insaf? (1980) as Shanta Nath
 Swayamvar (1980) as Jwala
 Saajan Mere Main Saajan Ki (1980)
 Kranti (1981) as Charumati (Shakti's Adopted Mother)
 Rocky (1981) as Sophia
 Biwi O Biwi (1981) as Nirmala
 Ahista Ahista (1981) as Subbalaxmi
 Jyothi (1981) as Sunanda (Niranjan's mom)
 Dial 100 (1982) as Shanti
 Teri Maang Sitaron Se Bhar Doon (1982) as Anand's Mother
 Yeh To Kamaal Ho Gaya (1982)
 Samraat (1982) as Ranbir's mom
 Anokha Bandhan (1982) as Annapurna's mom
 Log Kya Kahenge (1982)
 Souten (1983) as Renu Prannath Pasha (as Shashi Kala)
 Dard-E-Dil (1983) as Shola Beghum
 Ram Tera Desh (1984) as Kanta Saxena
 Lek Chalali Sasarla (1984) as Aaisaheb
 Tawaif (1985) as Bilquis Bai (as Shashi Kala)
 Arjun (1985) as Mrs. Rukhmini Malvankar
 Mahananda (1985)
 Amma (1986) as Jiji
 Preeti (1986 film)
 Khamosh Nigahen (1986)
 Dhakti Soon (1986) as Ujwala's patron
 Dadagiri (1987) as Shanti B. Singh
 Besahara (1987) as Rakesh's Mother
 Mera Karam Mera Dharam (1987) as Mrs. Taraknath
 Ghar Ghar Ki Kahani (1988) as Mrs. Dhanraj
 Main Tere Liye (1988) as Anjana Saxena
 Sach (1989) as Mrs. Chinoy
 Salma Pe Dil Aa Gaya (1997) as Dai Maa
 Lahoo Ke Do Rang (1997) as Chachi
 Main Solah Baras Ki (1998)
 Maharaja (1998) as Ranbir's mom
 Pardesi Babu (1998) as Mai (landlady)
 Dhoondte Reh Jaaoge! (1998) as Mrs. Malhotra
 Baadshah (1999) as Raj(Baadshah)'s Mother
 Mother (1999) as Mrs. Chaudhary
 Agniputra (2000)
 Uljhan (2001) as Varun's grandma
 Kabhi Khushi Kabhie Gham (2001) as Ashfaque's grandmother
 Jhankaar Beats (2003) as Shanti's mother
 Chori Chori (2003) as Chachi
 Mujhse Shaadi Karogi (2004) as Grandma Malhotra
 Rakht (2004) as Dhristi's Grandmother
 Padmashree Laloo Prasad Yadav (2005) as South African Witness

References

External links
 
 

1932 births
2021 deaths
Indian film actresses
Actresses in Hindi cinema
Indian television actresses
People from Solapur
Marathi people
Recipients of the Padma Shri in arts
Filmfare Awards winners
20th-century Indian actresses
21st-century Indian actresses